Winnipeg South Centre is a federal electoral district in Manitoba, Canada, that has been represented in the House of Commons of Canada from 1925 to 1979 and since 1988.

Geography
The district includes the neighbourhoods of Beaumont, Brockville, Buffalo, Chevrier, Crescent Park, Crescentwood, Earl Grey, Eby-Wentworth, Edgeland, Fort Garry, Grant Park, J.B. Mitchell, Linden Woods, Lord Roberts, Mathers, Maybank, McMillan, Osborne Village, Parker, Pembina Strip, Point Road, River Heights, Riverview, Rockwood, Roslyn, Sir John Franklin, Tuxedo, Wellington Crescent and Wildwood Park in the city of Winnipeg.

The Liberals tend to win their most votes in River Heights and adjacent neighbourhoods like Wellington Crescent. They are also strong in Roslyn. The Conservatives tend to do best in Tuxedo and Brockville. The NDP tends to do the best in Osborne Village.

Demographics
According to the Canada 2021 Census

Ethnic groups: 68.5% White, 8.3% Indigenous, 6.3% South Asian, 3.8% Black, 3.6% Filipino, 3.1% Chinese, 1.5% Latin American
Languages: 77.1% English, 2.5% French, 1.7% Tagalog, 1.6% Punjabi, 1.5% Spanish, 1.5% Mandarin, 1.5% German 
Religions: 44.1% Christian (16.3% Catholic, 5.2% United Church, 3.7% Anglican, 1.9% Anabaptist, 1.9% Orthodox, 1.8% Lutheran, 13.3% Others), 6.4% Jewish, 2.7% Muslim, 2.3% Hindu, 1.8% Sikh, 40.8% No religion 
Median income (2020): $44,000 
Average income (2020): $63,850

History
The electoral district was originally created in 1924 from the ridings of Winnipeg South and Winnipeg Centre. Its first iteration was generally located west of the Red River and north of the Assiniboine River. In 1952, it gained parts the Rural Municipality (and later city) of St. James. In 1966, it gained parts the municipalities of Assiniboia, and Charleswood, and the Town of Tuxedo. By this time, the riding had moved further west, and crossed the Assiniboine.

In 1976, it was abolished with its territory transferred to the ridings of Winnipeg—Assiniboine and Winnipeg—St. James.

The electoral district was re-created in 1987 from parts of the redrawn ridings of St. Boniface and Winnipeg North Centre, and the abolished Winnipeg—Assiniboine and Winnipeg—Fort Garry. The new riding was almost entirely south of the Assiniboine River, except for Downtown Winnipeg, and had very little territory in common with the original Winnipeg South Centre.

The district's boundaries were redistributed in 1996 and 2003. The 2003 redistribution moved the riding entirely south of the Assiniboine for the first time.

This riding gained territory from Winnipeg South during the 2012 electoral redistribution.

Following the report from the 2022 electoral redistribution, the riding is set to lose the Tuxedo area to the new riding of Winnipeg West, while adding Whyte Ridge, Linden Ridge and West Fort Garry Industrial from Winnipeg South.

Members of Parliament

This riding has elected the following Members of Parliament:

Current Member of Parliament
Jim Carr represented Winnipeg South Centre from the 2015 election until his death in 2022, having been re-elected in 2019 and 2021.

Election results

1988–present

1925–1979

Student vote results

See also
 List of Canadian federal electoral districts
 Past Canadian electoral districts

References

 
 
 
 Expenditures - 2008
Expenditures - 2004

Notes

Manitoba federal electoral districts
Politics of Winnipeg
Tuxedo, Winnipeg
Fort Rouge, Winnipeg
Fort Garry, Winnipeg
River Heights, Winnipeg